Andrey Alekseevich Mishin (born 18 September 1976) is a Russian former professional tennis player.

A Saint Petersburg native, Mishin has a background in the sport of figure skating. He was a figure skater in his younger years and is the son of Alexei Mishin, an Olympic figure skater who became a famous coach, tutoring the likes of Evgeni Plushenko. His brother, Nikolay, also played tennis professionally.

Mishin never competed on the international tennis tour, only featuring in events held in his home city. In 2004 he teamed up with Mikhail Elgin to win a Challenger doubles title in Saint Petersburg and two-months later the pair received a wildcard to compete at the St. Petersburg Open, an ATP Tour event.

Now working as a tennis coach, Mishin is married to one of his pupils, WTA Tour player Daria Mishina (née Mironova).

ATP Challenger titles

Doubles: (1)

References

External links
 
 

1976 births
Living people
Russian male tennis players
Sportspeople from Saint Petersburg